Pietro III Candiano was the Doge of Venice from 942 until 959. He was the son of Pietro II Candiano.

Life
In 948 he led a fleet of 33 galleys to punish the Dalmatian pirates, the Narentines, for repeatedly raiding against Venetian shipping in the Adriatic Sea. After the attempt failed, he tried again, but the result was a peace treaty that made the Venice pay tribute to the Narentines for safe passage for the next 50 years, until Doge Pietro II Orseolo's reign. His dogaressa was Arcielda Candiano.

Marriage and issue
Pietro and Arcielda had:
Doge Pietro IV Candiano (930 - 976)
Domenigo Candiano
Vitale Candiano, Bishop of Torcello, Doge of Venice (-979)
Stefano Candiano
Elena Candiano.

References

Sources

10th-century Doges of Venice
Candiano family
959 deaths